Iwata may refer to:

Iwata, Shizuoka, city located in Shizuoka, Japan
Iwata (surname)
Satoru Iwata, former president and CEO of Nintendo
Júbilo Iwata, professional Japanese football club